Robert J. Wood is a roboticist and a professor of electrical engineering at the Harvard School of Engineering and Applied Sciences and the Wyss Institute for Biologically Inspired Engineering at Harvard University, and is the director of the Harvard Microrobotics Laboratory. He holds a PhD in electrical engineering from the University of California at Berkeley. At Harvard University, he directs the NSF-funded RoboBees project, a 5-year project to build a swarm of robotic bees. In 2008, he was named to the MIT Technology Reviews TR35 list and became a recipient of the Presidential Early Career Award for Scientists and Engineers.

Article 

 The Robobee Project Is Building Flying Robots the Size of Insects by Robert Wood, Radhika Nagpal and Gu-Yeon Wei in the March 11, 2013 Scientific American

References 

Living people
American electrical engineers
American roboticists
UC Berkeley College of Engineering alumni
John A. Paulson School of Engineering and Applied Sciences faculty
Year of birth missing (living people)